Erechthias stilbella is a species of moth in the family Tineidae. It was described by Edward Doubleday in 1843. This species is endemic to New Zealand.

References

External links
Image of type specimen of Erechthias stilbella

Moths described in 1843
Erechthiinae
Moths of New Zealand
Endemic fauna of New Zealand
Taxa named by Edward Doubleday
Endemic moths of New Zealand